Revisionary materialism is the view that falls between eliminative materialism and reductive materialism when it comes to a particular psychological phenomenon.

Take, for example, debates over the reality of a psychological concept like "demonology" – the posit that evil spirits influence human behaviour. An eliminativist might argue that this theory completely fails to describe anything real; the reductionist might argue that the concepts are valid, and that science will simply provide an increasingly detailed understanding of the demons. The revisionist would be somewhere in between, suggesting only that partial revision of the common sense understanding will be necessary. That is, parts of the demon theory will be validated by future research.

Today, one is likely to be eliminativist about demons. However, eliminative materialists mention other psychological concepts (e.g. belief, will, consciousness) about which one is more likely to be revisionist.

Unlike strong eliminative materialism, the revisionist often claims that a theory or concept is only partially incorrect, perhaps because it ignores a few important causal factors.

References 

Materialism
Philosophy of science
Metaphysical theories
Metaphysics of mind